The Garda Mountains, occasionally also the Garda Hills, are an extensive mountain range of the Southern Limestone Alps in northern Italy.

Boundaries and countryside 
The Garda Mountains are bounded in the south by the Po Valley and in the north by the Brenta Dolomites, in the east by the Adige Valley and in the west by the  Valli Giudicarie.
Their precise boundary, according to the Alpine Club classification of the Eastern Alps, is as follows:
Lake Iseo – Col di San Zeno – Val Trompia – Passo di Manivia – Bagolino – Storo – Tione – Vezzano – Trento – Val d'Adige/Etschtal – Verona – Brescia – Lake Iseo.

The climate of the Garda Mountains is very mild as a result of its southerly location and the influence of the Mediterranean Sea. Snow rarely falls in the Sarca valley and on the shores of Lake Garda, and, in spring and autumn, temperatures of between 15-20 °C are often experienced. The Garda Mountains have very few glaciers and ski resorts. The Alpinist centre of the range is the town of Arco. In the vicinity of Arco there are countless sport climbing areas.

Lake Garda and its surrounding mountains are a popular destination for water sportsmen, mountain bikers, hikers and climbers.

On the western shore of Lake Garda is the Parco Alto Garda Bresciano nature park.

Lakes 
 Lake Garda (Lago di Garda)
 Lago di Ledro
 Lago di Valvestino
 Lago di Cei
 Lago di Tenno
 Lago pra de la Stua
 Lagetto d'Ampola
 Lago di Cavedine
 Lago di Toblino

Valleys 

 Valle d'Ampolla
 Val Cavedine
 Val di Cei
 Valle di Concei
 Valle dei Laghi (Sarca Valley)
 Val di Ledro
 Valle Toscolano
 Valle di Vesta

Significant peaks 

 Monte Cadria, 2,254 m
 Cima Valdritta, 2,218 m
 Punta Telegrafo, 2,200 m
 Monte Bondone, 2,180 m
 Monte Altissimo di Nago, 2,079 m
 Monte Caplone, 1,976 m
 Monte Tremalzo, 1,974 m
 Monte Casale, 1,632 m
 Monte Pizzocolo, 1,581 m

Vie ferrate 
Vie ferrate include:
 Sentiero attrezzato del Colodri (Cima Colodri)
 Sentiero attrezzato Fausto Susatti (Cima Capi)
 Via dell'Amicizia (Cima SAT)
 Che Guevara (Monte Casale, 1632 m)
 Via ferrata Rino Pisetta (Dain Picol, 971 m)
 Sentiero attrezzato Gerardo Sega (Malga Cola)
 Monte Albano (Mori)

Literature 
 Kompass Karte (1:50,000 scale), Alpi di Ledro, Valli Giudicarie, Innsbruck, 2003,  
 Eugen E. Hülser, Hülsers Klettersteigführer Gardasee, Bruckmann, Munich,

External links 

 
Mountain ranges of the Alps
Mountain ranges of Trentino
Southern Limestone Alps
Province of Brescia
Province of Verona
Landforms of Veneto